Founded in 1978, the American English Institute (AEI) is a unit of the College of Arts and Sciences within the University of Oregon providing ESL (English as a Second Language) courses . Located in Eugene, Oregon, the AEI now has three academic offerings:  the Intensive English Program (IEP), Academic English for International Students (AEIS), and Distance Education. Housed in Agate Hall, the AEI offers English language courses to students of all experience levels.

References

 

University of Oregon
1978 establishments in Oregon
Educational institutions established in 1978
Schools of English as a second or foreign language